Caizhou or Cai Prefecture was a zhou (prefecture) in imperial China in modern Henan, China, seated in modern Runan County. It existed (intermittently) from 606 until 1293.

Caizhou was the location of the Siege of Caizhou, the last major battle of the Mongol conquest of the Jin dynasty, which took place in 1233.

References

 

Prefectures of the Sui dynasty
Prefectures of the Tang dynasty
Prefectures of Later Zhou
Prefectures of Later Tang
Prefectures of Later Liang (Five Dynasties)
Prefectures of Later Jin (Five Dynasties)
Prefectures of Later Han (Five Dynasties)
Prefectures of the Song dynasty
Prefectures of the Yuan dynasty
Prefectures of the Jin dynasty (1115–1234)
Former prefectures in Henan